The Infernal Machine is a 2022 psychological mystery thriller film written and directed by Andrew Hunt. It is based on a story written by Louis Kornfeld. The film stars Guy Pearce, Alice Eve, Jeremy Davies, and Alex Pettyfer.

The Infernal Machine was released in the United States on September 23, 2022, and in the United Kingdom on December 2, 2022, by Paramount Pictures.

Synopsis
Bruce Cogburn, a reclusive and controversial author of the famed book The Infernal Machine, is drawn out of hiding when he begins to receive endless letters from an obsessive fan.

Cast
 Guy Pearce as Bruce Cogburn 
 Alice Eve as Officer Laura Higgins
 Alex Pettyfer as Dwight Tufford
 Jeremy Davies as Elijah Barett

Production
Filming took place over five weeks in Algarve, Portugal, in Portugal’s Moviebox Studios, and on locations in and around the town of Loulé. Paramount Pictures acquired worldwide rights to The Infernal Machine in October 2021. The film was financed by executive producer Jack Christian's financing firm, Filmology Finance.

Reception

Critical response 
On Rotten Tomatoes, 46% of 13 critics gave the film a positive review, with an average rating of 5.5/10.

Ewan Gleadow of Cult Following wrote positively of the film, praising Guy Pearce for having "finally found comfort and quality in a performance that should hopefully buffer his star that little bit more."

References

External links
 
 

2022 films
Films shot in Portugal
Films shot in the Algarve
Films about writers
American psychological thriller films